The phrase "landmark hotel" is frequently used to generically describe historically or architecturally significant hotels throughout the world, and is often tied to designated status as a national, Regional, State or Local historic landmark.

Hotels called the Landmark Hotel, or something similar, include:

Empire Landmark Hotel, in Vancouver, British Columbia
Faust Landmark, Rockford, Illinois
Hotel Landmark Canton
InterContinental Hanoi Landmark 72 is an InterContinental hotel in Hanoi
Landmark Hotel (Bangkok), Thailand
Landmark Hotel (New Orleans), located in the suburb of Metairie, Louisiana
Landmark Hotel (Port Harcourt), Rivers State
Landmark Mandarin Oriental located in The Landmark office and shopping development in Hong Kong
Safi Landmark Hotel in Kabul, Afghanistan
Seminole Cafe and Hotel, now known as the Landmark Hotel, in Homestead, Florida. It is listed on the National Register of Historic Places.
The Landmark Hotel and Casino, a hotel-casino in Las Vegas, Nevada that was imploded in 1995
The Landmark London, formerly the Great Central Hotel

See also
Landmark Inn, Marquette, Michigan
Landmark Inn State Historic Site in Castroville, Texas